Windsor Girls' School (WGS) is an upper school for girls aged 13–18 in Windsor, Berkshire, England. While most other schools in Berkshire operate on a two-tier system with pupils entering secondary school at age 11, the local LEA uses the three-tier system, hence the 13+ entry age. It previously held Business & Enterprise specialist status and was rated "good, with outstanding features" by Ofsted inspectors in 2010. In 2014, the school was rated outstanding. Its partner school is The Windsor Boys' School.

History
WGS was originally Windsor County Girls' School, a private school, during the inter-war period, founded in 1920, and later Windsor County Grammar School for Girls during the era of the tripartite system. It turned comprehensive during the 1970s when the system was abolished.

Notable Alumnae
Geraldine McEwan, actress
Lauren Aquilina, singer/songwriter

Houses
Dream
Jansen Spence
Epstein
The White house

References

Further reading

External links
School website

1920 establishments in England
Educational institutions established in 1920
Girls' schools in Berkshire
Upper schools in the Royal Borough of Windsor and Maidenhead
Defunct grammar schools in England
Academies in the Royal Borough of Windsor and Maidenhead